Funky G are a Serbian dance duo.

The duo comprises Anabela (vocals) and Gagi Đogani (born Gazmen Đogani). Gagi, who is the leader of the group, is a brother of Đole Đogani who is leader of another Serbian dance music group, Đogani. Until 2009 Anabela Atijas, Gagi's ex-wife, was a member of the group.

Funky G were one of the first music groups promoting dance music in the region. They became famous with their song "Samo u Snu" ("Only in a Dream"), launching a dance music scene in the former Yugoslavia to new levels (often blending it with folk elements).

On 29 April 2009, Anabela and Gagi Djogani divorced. In 2011, Ana Rich replaced Anabela, but she left after a year. In 2012, Marina replaced Ana.

Discography

Albums
1994 - Samo u snu ("Only in the Dream")
1995 - Mi smo tu ("We Are Here")
1996 - Budi tu ("Be Here")
1997 - Hej ti ("Hey You")
1998 - Supersonic
1999 - Tebi ("To You")
2000 - Dođe mi da... ("I Feel Like...")
2001 - Napraviću lom ("I'll Break a Rule")
2002 - Napravi se lud ("Go Crazy")
2003 - The Best of
2005 - Nedodirljiva ("Untouchable")
2007 - Osmi smrtni greh ("Eighth Deadly Sin")
2008 - Kafana na Balkanu ("Café on the Balkan")
2009 - Pali Anđeo ("Fallen Angel")
2009 - Retro Collection

Singles
 2010 - "Arogantna kraljica" (with Marina Uzelac)
 2012 - "Jača nego pre" (with Ana Rich)
 2012 - "Nije moja ljubav slepa" (with Ana Rich)
 2012 - "Zlatna ribica" (with Ana Rich)
 2012 - "Godina zmaja" (with Ana Rich)
 2012 - "Sviđa li ti se moja draga" (feat. Igor X) (with Ana Rich)

Videography
 Plakati zauvek
 Ti si nešto najbolje
 Leti leti
 Budi tu
 Jel‘ ti žao
 Zabrani mi
 Samo u snu
 Drugu si hteo
 Gad
 Gromovi
 Igraj
 Ja imam nekog (ft Deen)
 Legenda
 Napravi se lud
 Napraviću lom
 Robinja
 Neću nikog
 Supersoničan je ritam
 Biće mi teško
 Arogantna kraljica
 U tvojim kolima (ft Juice)
 Veštica iz Srbije (ft Vrchak)
 Pali andjeo
 Jača nego pre
 Kafana na Balkanu

References

External links
Official website
Anabela - Funky G fan site

Musical groups established in 1994
Male–female musical duos
Serbian pop-folk music groups
1994 establishments in Yugoslavia
Serbian Eurodance groups